Pauline Marie Monique Mandanas Gaston (born August 27, 1997) is a Filipino volleyball athlete. She played with Ateneo Lady Eagles collegiate women's University team. She currently plays for the Chery Tiggo Crossovers in the Premier Volleyball League.

Personal life 
Ponggay Gaston is the daughter of former PBA player Matthew "Fritz" Gaston and former beauty queen Duday Mandanas-Gaston. She studied high school at the University of Santo Tomas. She studied interdisciplinary studies at the Ateneo De Manila University.

Filmography

Television

Volleyball career 
Ponggay Gaston played for the Ateneo De Manila University collegiate women's University team alongside her sister Therese Gaston.

In 2020, she became the captain of the Ateneo Lady Eagles in the UAAP Season 84 volleyball tournaments but the tournament was cut due to the spread of COVID-19.

In August 2020, Gaston was signed by the Choco Mucho Flying Titans.

In 2023, she was signed by the Chery Tiggo Crossovers.

Awards

Individual

Collegiate

Clubs

Clubs 
  Ateneo-Motolite - (2018)
  Choco Mucho Flying Titans - (2021–2022)
  Chery Tiggo Crossovers - (2023-present)

References 

Filipino women's volleyball players
1997 births
Living people
21st-century Filipino women
Outside hitters